The Park Hotel is a Grade II listed   pub, restaurant and hotel at 19 Park Road, Teddington, London TW11.

An earlier building on the site was known as The Greyhound in 1729, and briefly, the Guilford Arms in 1795. It was rebuilt in 1863, and became the Clarence Arms Inn, and later the Clarence Hotel.

References

External links
 
 

19th-century establishments in England
Grade II listed buildings in the London Borough of Richmond upon Thames
Grade II listed pubs in London
Teddington
Pubs in the London Borough of Richmond upon Thames